In comparison with General Relativity, dynamic variables of metric-affine gravitation theory are both a pseudo-Riemannian metric  and a general linear connection  on  a world manifold . Metric-affine gravitation theory has been suggested as a natural generalization of Einstein–Cartan theory of gravity with torsion where a linear connection obeys the condition that a covariant derivative of a metric equals zero.

Metric-affine gravitation theory straightforwardly comes from gauge gravitation theory where a general linear connection plays the role of a gauge field. Let  be the tangent bundle over a manifold  provided with bundle coordinates .

 

It is associated to a principal connection on the principal frame bundle  of frames in the tangent spaces to  whose structure group is a general linear group  . Consequently, it can be treated as a gauge field. Therefore, one can regard it as a classical Higgs field in gauge gravitation theory. Gauge symmetries of metric-affine gravitation theory are general covariant transformations.

It is essential that, given a pseudo-Riemannian metric , any linear connection  on  admits a splitting

 

in the Christoffel symbols

 

a nonmetricity tensor

 

and a contorsion tensor

 

where

 

Due to this splitting, metric-affine gravitation theory possesses a different collection of dynamic variables which are a pseudo-Riemannian metric, a non-metricity tensor and a torsion tensor. As a consequence, a Lagrangian of metric-affine gravitation theory can contain different terms expressed both in a   curvature of a connection  and its torsion and non-metricity tensors.

A linear connection  is called the metric connection for a
pseudo-Riemannian metric  if  is its integral section, i.e.,
the metricity condition

 

holds. A metric connection reads

 

For instance, the Levi-Civita connection in General Relativity is a torsion-free metric connection.

A metric connection is associated to a principal connection on a Lorentz reduced subbundle  of the frame bundle  corresponding to a section  of the quotient bundle . Restricted to metric connections, metric-affine gravitation theory comes to the above-mentioned Einstein – Cartan gravitation theory.

At the same time, any linear connection  defines a principal adapted connection  on a Lorentz reduced subbundle  by its restriction to a Lorentz subalgebra of a Lie algebra of a general linear group . For instance, the Dirac operator in metric-affine gravitation theory in the presence of a general linear connection  is well defined, and it depends just of the adapted connection . Therefore, Einstein–Cartan gravitation theory can be formulated as the metric-affine one, without appealing to the metricity constraint.

In metric-affine gravitation theory, in comparison with the Einstein – Cartan one, a question on a matter source of a non-metricity tensor arises. It is so called hypermomentum, e.g., a Noether current of a scaling symmetry.

See also
Gauge gravitation theory
Einstein–Cartan theory
Affine gauge theory
Classical unified field theories

References
 F.Hehl, J. McCrea, E. Mielke, Y. Ne'eman, Metric-affine gauge theory of gravity: field equations, Noether identities, world spinors, and breaking of dilaton invariance, Physics Reports 258 (1995) 1-171; 
 V. Vitagliano, T. Sotiriou, S. Liberati, The dynamics of metric-affine gravity, Annals of Physics 326 (2011) 1259-1273;  
  G. Sardanashvily, Classical gauge gravitation theory, Int. J. Geom. Methods Mod. Phys. 8 (2011)  1869-1895; 
 C. Karahan, A. Altas, D. Demir, Scalars, vectors and tensors from metric-affine gravity, General Relativity and Gravitation 45 (2013) 319-343; 

Theories of gravity